Abhayadev (25 June 1913 – 26 July 2000) was an Indian poet and lyricist during the 1970s in Malayalam movies. He wrote lyrics for around 500 films and dialogues for 25 Malayalam movies. He was born as Ayyappan Pillai, to Karimalil Kesava Pillai who was also a well-known poet, at Pallam near Kottayam.  He made his debut in 1949 as lyricist in the film Vellinakshatram. He was actively involved in the activities of Sahitya Pravarthaka Cooperative Society (SPCS), Hindi Prachar Sabha, and numerous other social and cultural organisations till his death. He was awarded the J. C. Daniel Award in 1995. His one grandson Ambilikuttan is a play back singer. Another grand son Jayadevan is an international violinist settled in Canada and he received the award for best original score in 2021 from Hollywood Film Awards for the film FEAR

Partial filmography

Lyrics
 Jeevitha Vaadi ...	Vellinakshathram	1949
 Aashaheenam ...	Vellinakshathram	1949
 Premamanoharame ...	Vellinakshathram	1949
 Evam Niravadhiroopangal ...	Vellinakshathram	1949
 Alolamala ...	Vellinakshathram	1949
 Thrikkodi ...	Vellinakshathram	1949
 Aashaamohaname ...	Vellinakshathram	1949
 Porinaay Iranguvin ...	Vellinakshathram	1949
 Shokavikalame ...	Vellinakshathram	1949
 Raagaramya Madhukale ...	Vellinakshathram	1949
 Vidhiyude Leela ...	Prasanna	1950
 Kalaanikethe Keralamaathe ...	Prasanna	1950
 Sukritharaaga ...	Prasanna	1950
 Dhavalaroopa ...	Prasanna	1950
 Gaanamohana Hare ...	Prasanna	1950
 Kaayikasoubhaagyam ...	Prasanna	1950
 Sneham Thookum ...	Prasanna	1950
 Jaathivairam Neethirahitham ...	Prasanna	1950
 Bhaarathamaatha Paripoorna ...	Prasanna	1950
 Aagathamaay Madhukaalam ...	Prasanna	1950
 Ninnai Sharanaandainthen ...	Prasanna	1950
 Ponne Neeyum Njanum ...	Prasanna	1950
 Thakarukayo Sakalamen ...	Prasanna	1950
 Ellaam Sundaramayam ...	Prasanna	1950
 Rathnam Vithachaal ...	Nallathanka	1950
 Mahesha Maayamo ...	Nallathanka	1950
 Pathiye Daivam ...	Nallathanka	1950
 Sodara Bandhamathonne ...	Nallathanka	1950
 Imbamerum Ithalaakum ...	Nallathanka	1950
 Manoharamee Raajyam ...	Nallathanka	1950

Dialogue
 Yaachakan (1951)
 Desabhakthan (1952)
 Natyathaara (1955)
 Shaanthi Nivas (1962)
 Ardharaathri (1969)
 Jeevithasamaram (1971)
 Sreekrishna Leela (1971)
 Sathi Anasooya (1972)
 Vilakkappetta Kani (1974)
 Aval Oru Thudarkadha (1975)
 Raja Mayoora Varma (1976)
 Kollakkaaran (1976)
 Seethaa Swayamvaram (1976)
 Velaankanni Mathavu (1977)
 Chila Nerangalil Chila Manushyar (1977)
 Misiha Charithram (1978)
 Sankaraabharanam (1980)
 Sapthapadi (1981)
 Thirakal Ezhuthiya Kavitha (1980)
 Panineerppookkal (1981)
 Thennal Thedunna Poovu (1984)
 Mayoori (1985)

References

Indian male composers
1913 births
2000 deaths
Malayalam film score composers
20th-century Indian composers
People from Kottayam district
Film musicians from Kerala
Indian lyricists
Poets from Kerala
20th-century Indian poets
Male film score composers
20th-century Indian male musicians
J. C. Daniel Award winners